Ana Vidović (born 8 November 1980) is a classical guitarist originally from Croatia. A child prodigy, she has won a number of prizes and international competitions all over the world.

Early life
Vidović was born on November 8, 1980, in Karlovac, Croatia. Her father, Ljubomir, played bass guitar and performed with his band nationwide in his youth. She has two older brothers: Viktor is a classical guitarist, who inspired her to play, and Silvije is a concert pianist. She started playing guitar at age 5, went to music school in her hometown, and began performing at 8. By the age of 11, Vidović was performing internationally and showed such an extraordinary talent that at 13, she became the youngest student to attend Academy of Music in Zagreb (the time of the Croatian War of Independence). She studied with Professor István Römer, graduating in 1998.

Her reputation in Europe led to an invitation by world renowned classical guitarist and professor Manuel Barrueco to study at the Peabody Conservatory in Baltimore, Maryland, from which she graduated in 2003.

Career 
Her international career includes frequent recitals, concerto engagements, festival appearances, and tours all over the world. Vidović has performed with numerous orchestras. She often plays works by Johann Sebastian Bach, who is her favorite composer, and other composers such as Federico Moreno Torroba, Manuel Ponce, Francisco Tárrega, and Joaquín Rodrigo (including Concierto de Aranjuez).

Ana Vidović has won over twenty awards at international competitions, in which she participated until she was 18 years old. Her accolades include first prizes in the Albert Augustine Memorial International Competition (Bath, England) at the age of 13, the Fernando Sor competition (Rome, Italy), and the Francisco Tárrega competition (Benicàssim, Spain). Other top prizes include the Eurovision Young Musicians competition, the Mauro Giuliani competition in Italy, the Printemps de la Guitare competition in Belgium, and the Young Concert Artists International Auditions in New York.

In a review of one of her performances in 2006, Stephen Brookes of The Washington Post wrote: "her playing [...] was virtually immaculate – detailed, precise and polished. But this was no mere virtuosic display. Vidovic's playing is nuanced and intensely personal, both deeply felt and deeply thought." Guitar Review'''s Stephen Griesgraber noted "It is difficult to know where to begin when discussing the enormous talents of Ana Vidovic. Her dynamic range, beauty of sound, precision of articulation and virtuosity are such that listening becomes more of an absolute musical experience."

She cites Paco de Lucía as a role model, John Williams as a significant musical inspiration, along with many other composers and musicians. She mentioned Jacqueline du Pré's performance of the Elgar Concerto as one of her favorite classical CDs.

Vidović plays a Jim Redgate guitar exclusively and said, "[Several] years ago, I tried a Redgate [...] and felt an immediate connection [...].
This is a very special instrument that you could explore for many years."

She has released six CDs, two live DVDs, and has been featured on compilation albums. Guitar Virtuoso (2006) DVD is a performance of works by Bach, Torroba, Paganini, and Walton; while on Guitar Artistry in Concert (2009), she performs the music of Torroba, Piazzolla, Pierre Bensusan, Sérgio Assad, Stanley Myers, Villa-Lobos, and Barrios.

Discography
CDs
 Ana Vidovic, Croatia Records, 1994
 Ana Vidović - Guitar, BGS Records (BGCD 103), 1996
 The Croatian Prodigy, BGS, 1999
 Guitar Recital: Ana Vidovic, Naxos Laureate Series (8.554563), 2000
 Ana Vidovic Live!, Croatia Records, 2001
 Moreno-Torroba: Guitar Music, Vol. 1, Naxos (8.557902), 2007
DVDs
 Ana Vidovic: Guitar Virtuoso, Mel Bay Publications Inc. (21186DVD), 2006
 Ana Vidovic: Guitar Artistry in Concert'', Mel Bay Publications Inc. (21991DVD), 2009

References

External links

 Official site
 
 Naxos CD releases
 
 
 Interview with NY Classical Guitar Society in 2007
 Interview with Tokafi Guitar Magazine in 2007
 Live Performance at the Kennedy Center in 2004
 Interview with Cithara (Luxembourg) in 2003

Croatian classical guitarists
Women classical guitarists
1980 births
Living people
People from Karlovac
Croatian expatriates in the United States
University of Zagreb alumni
Peabody Institute alumni
21st-century women guitarists